The Fisher Building is a landmark skyscraper located at 3011 West Grand Boulevard in the heart of the New Center area of Detroit, Michigan. The ornate 30-story building, completed in 1928, is one of the major works of architect Albert Kahn, and is designed in an Art Deco style, faced with limestone, granite, and several types of marble. The Fisher family financed the building with proceeds from the sale of Fisher Body to General Motors. It was designed to house office and retail space.

The building, which contains the elaborate 2,089-seat Fisher Theatre, was designated a National Historic Landmark on June 29, 1989. It also houses the headquarters for the Detroit Public Schools and the studios of radio stations WJR, WDVD, and WDRQ.

History

Initially, architect Joseph Nathaniel French of Albert Kahn Associates planned for a complex of three buildings, with two 30-story structures flanking a 60-story tower. However, the Great Depression caused the project to be scaled back to a single tower.

The Fisher brothers located the building across from the General Motors Building, now Cadillac Place, as General Motors had recently purchased the Fisher Body Company. The two massive buildings spurred the development of a New Center for the city, a business district north of its downtown area.

The building's hipped roof was originally covered with gold leaf tiles, but during World War II these tiles were covered in asphalt because it was feared that the reflective surface would attract enemy bombers. After the war, the asphalt could not be removed from the gold tiles without harming them, so they were replaced with green tiles. Since the 1980s, these tiles have been illuminated at night with colored lights to give them a gold appearance. On St. Patrick's Day, the lights are changed to green and, in recent years, to celebrate the NHL playoffs, the tower is illuminated with red lights in honor of the Detroit Red Wings.

In 1974, Tri-Star Development purchased the Fisher Building and adjoining New Center Building for approximately $20 million.

In 2001, FK Acquisition LLC, a real estate firm based in Southfield, purchased the two buildings from TrizecHahn Corporation for $31 million. FK Acquisition LLC lost the buildings to its lender in 2015.

In 2002, Detroit Public Schools (DPS) paid the owner of the Fisher Building $24.1 million to purchase five floors to house administrative offices, citing the high cost of renovations needed at the Maccabees Building, the previous headquarters, to comply with building and safety codes.

In July 2015, Southfield-based developer Redico LLC, in partnership with HFZ Capital Group of New York City and Peter Cummings of The Platform, a Detroit-based development company, taking advantage of the general decline in Detroit real estate values, purchased the Fisher Building and adjacent Albert Kahn Building, plus 2,000 parking spaces in two parking structures and three surface lots in New Center for only $12.2 million at auction. Redico said the partnership plans to transform the two buildings, which are connected by an underground pedestrian concourse, into what it called a "true urban" mixed-use development, with a mix of office, retail, residential and entertainment uses. The multi-year project has a potential cost of $70 million to $80 million in addition to the purchase price. The Redico interest was purchased by Cummings and his partner in The Platform, Dietrich Knoer, in 2016.

Architecture
The building has 21 elevators. Albert Kahn and Associates designed the building with Joseph Nathaniel French serving as chief architect. French took inspiration from Eliel Saarinen's Tribune Tower design of 1922, seen in the emphasis on verticality and the stepped-back upper stories. The building is unlike any other Albert Kahn production. It has been called "Detroit's largest art object".

In 1929, the Architectural League of New York honored the Fisher Building with a silver medal in architecture. The opulent three-story barrel vaulted lobby is constructed with forty different kinds of marble, decorated by Hungarian artist Géza Maróti, and is highly regarded by architects. The sculpture on the exterior of the building was supplied by several sculptors including Maróti, Corrado Parducci, Anthony De Lorenzo and Ulysses Ricci.

Radio
Designs called for two flagpoles atop the gilt roof. While they were installed, they were essentially unusable as a radio antenna was installed when one of the building's oldest tenants, radio station WJR, leased space in December 1928. On-air hosts often mention that broadcasts originate "from the golden tower of the Fisher Building." This was a requirement of the station's original lease in exchange for a nominal rent. Two other radio stations, WDVD-FM (the former WJR-FM) and WDRQ-FM, also have broadcast studios in the building.

In 1970, building employees discovered a storage room sealed with tape. None of the staff knew what the room contained or why it was sealed. When they located the key, they found the flags of 75 nations that apparently were created in 1928 and intended to be flown for foreign visitors.

Fisher Theatre
The building also is home to the Fisher Theatre, one of Detroit's oldest live theatre venues. The theatre, designed by the Chicago-based architectural firm of Anker S. Graven & Arthur G. Mayger, originally featured a lavish Aztec-themed interior in the Mayan Revival style, and once had Mexican-Indian art, banana trees, and live macaws that its patrons could feed. After the Depression, the theatre operated primarily as a movie house until 1961. Originally containing 3,500 seats, the interior was renovated into a 2,089-seat playhouse that allowed for more spacious seating and lobbies for patrons at a cost of $3.5 million. The decor was changed to a simple mid-century design.

The Nederlander Organization opened the "new" Fisher Theatre October 2, 1961 and operated it until April 2021 when it sold the venue to the Ambassador Theatre Group. It primarily features traveling productions of Broadway shows and has hosted numerous out-of-town tryouts.

Pre-Broadway Engagements at the Fisher:

 1961: The Gay Life
 1962: No Strings, Bravo Giovanni, Oliver!
 1963: Sophie, Here's Love, Jennie, Hello, Dolly!
 1964: Foxy, Fiddler on the Roof, Golden Boy, I Had a Ball
 1965: Pleasures and Palaces, Pickwick, Skyscraper, Sweet Charity
 1966: Pousse-Café, Walking Happy
 1967: Illya Darling, Henry, Sweet Henry
 1968: George M!, I'm Solomon, Lovers and Other Strangers, Maggie Flynn
 1969: La Strada
 1970: Applause, The Rothschilds, Not Now, Darling
 1972: Tricks
 1973: Seesaw, Lorelei, Turtlenecks, Gigi
 1974: Good News, London Assurance, The Wiz
 1979: Sugar Babies, Oklahoma!
 1982: Seven Brides for Seven Brothers 
 1986: Into the Light
 1996: Big

Art
Befitting the Fisher Building's history in association with art, three nationally recognized fine-art galleries have occupied space in the structure including the Gertrude Kasle Gallery and London Fine Arts Group.

 Gertrude Kasle Gallery: Located in Suite 310 of the Fisher Building from 1965 to 1976 was a nationally recognized fine-art gallery hosting exhibits for some of the most highly respected artists of the second half of the 20th century including Willem de Kooning, Jim Dine, Helen Frankenthaler, Robert Goodnough, Adolph Gottlieb, Phillip Guston, Grace Hartigan, Ian Hornak, Ray Johnson, Robert Motherwell, Lowell Nesbitt, Claes Oldenburg, Robert Rauschenberg and Jack Tworkov.
 London Fine Arts Group: Located in a large portion of the third floor of the Fisher Building during the 1970s and 1980s, London Fine Arts Group acted as a publishing company assisting in producing limited edition art works for many internationally recognized artists including Yaacov Agam, Karel Appel, Arman, Romare Bearden, Gene Davis, Don Eddy, Alberto Giacometti, Ian Hornak, Lester Johnson, Alex Katz, Richard Lindner, Roberto Matta, Lowell Nesbitt, Robert Rauschenberg, Harry Bertoia, Donald Sultan, Victor Vasarely and Larry Zox.

Tenants
 Detroit Public Schools
 4th floor: Department of State and Federal Programs (Suite 450)
 6th floor: Office of the Secretary of the Board of Education
 9th floor:
 Office of Athletics 
 Office of Literacy
 Multilingual-Multicultural Education in DPS (Suite 119)
 Office of Specialized Student Services (Special Education)
 Office of Innovation
 10th floor:
 Division of Talent (Human Resources)
 Division of Labor Relations
 Division of Technology and Information Services (Suit 1000)
 11th floor:
 Division of Finance
 Payroll Department
 Office of Risk Management (Suite 1100)
 14th floor: Main Administration
 Office of the Emergency Manager
 Office of the Inspector General
 Operations Group
 Girl Scouts of Southeastern Michigan
 1st Floor: Council Shop
 5th Floor: Office
 Children's Hospital of Michigan Foundation - Suite 218
City Bakery
A Detroit shop of the famous New York City-based company.
The Allen Law Group, PC - Suite 2500

In 2017 The Platform LLC converted the fourth floor into rental space for arts-based groups.

See also

 Cadillac Place
 Guardian Building
 Albert Kahn Building
 Pewabic Pottery
 List of tallest buildings in Detroit
 List of National Historic Landmarks in Michigan
 National Register of Historic Places listings in Downtown and Midtown Detroit

References
 Notes

 Bibliography

External links

 
Fisher Building website
 
 
 Metro Times review of American City: Detroit Architecture
 Boxoffice Magazine 1962 story on Fisher Theatre remodel
 Motion Picture News 1929 Fisher Theatre pictorial

Art Deco architecture in Michigan
Art Deco skyscrapers
Arts centers in Michigan
Buildings and structures completed in 1928
Albert Kahn (architect) buildings
Buildings with sculpture by Corrado Parducci
Concert halls in Michigan
Culture of Detroit
Event venues established in 1929
Mayan Revival architecture
National Historic Landmarks in Metro Detroit
National Register of Historic Places in Detroit
Skyscraper office buildings in Detroit
Performing arts centers in Michigan
Theatres in Detroit
1928 establishments in Michigan
Event venues on the National Register of Historic Places in Michigan
Detroit Public Schools Community District